The Spellbinder is a 1939 American drama film directed by Jack Hively, written by Thomas Lennon and Joseph Fields, and starring Lee Tracy, Barbara Read, Patric Knowles, Allan Lane and Linda Hayes. It was released on July 28, 1939, by RKO Pictures.

Plot
Jed Marlowe is a lawyer that specialises in defending guilty criminals using loopholes and briberies. His daughter believes that the criminals saved by her father are actually innocent and marries a killer that should have gone to the electric chair if not for Jed.

Cast

References

External links 
 

1939 films
American black-and-white films
RKO Pictures films
1939 drama films
American drama films
Films produced by Cliff Reid
Films directed by Jack Hively
1930s English-language films
1930s American films